Robert Stafford Cranston (10 March 1890 — 20 November 1959) was a Scottish first-class cricketer and civil servant.

Cranston was born in March 1890 at Oldhamstocks, East Lothian. A club cricketer for both Brunswick and Dunfermline, Cranston made his debut for Scotland in first-class cricket against Ireland at Glasgow in 1922. He played two further first-class matches for Scotland in 1923, against Ireland at Dublin and Surrey at Glasgow. Cranston scored 35 runs in his three matches at an average of 17.50, with a highest score of 31. Outside of cricket, Cranston was employed as a clerk by the Air Ministry.

References

External links
 

1890 births
1959 deaths
People from Oldhamstocks
Scottish cricketers
Scottish civil servants